Ben Davis (born May 24, 1977) is an American politician serving in the Minnesota House of Representatives since 2023. A member of the Republican Party of Minnesota, Davis represents District 6A in northern Minnesota, which includes the city of Grand Rapids and parts of Cass, Crow Wing, and Itasca Counties.

Minnesota House of Representatives 
Davis was first elected to the Minnesota House of Representatives in 2022, after redistricting and the retirement of Republican incumbents John Poston and Dale Lueck. Davis serves on the Children and Families Finance and Policy, Climate and Energy Finance and Policy, and Elections Finance and Policy Committees.

Electoral history

Personal life 
Davis lives in Merrifield, Minnesota with his wife Dawn and six children.

References

External links 

Members of the Minnesota House of Representatives

1977 births
Living people